The Mary Rose Museum is a historical museum located at Historic Dockyards in Portsmouth in the United Kingdom run by the Mary Rose Trust.

Overview
The museum is dedicated to the 16th-century Tudor navy warship Mary Rose as well as the historical context in which she was active. The museum opened in 1984 and displays artefacts from the ship as well as the ship itself in a dedicated ship hall. Since opening it has been visited by over a million people.

History

In September 2009 the ship hall was closed to allow the start of construction of a new museum that was opened at the end of May 2013. 
The Mary Rose Museum (2013) was designed by architects WilkinsonEyre, Perkins+Will and built by construction firm Warings. The construction was challenging because the museum was built over the ship in the dry dock, which is a listed monument. During construction of the museum, conservation of the hull continued inside a sealed "hotbox". In April 2013, the polyethylene glycol sprays were turned off and the process of controlled air drying began. In 2016 the "hotbox" walls were removed and after reopening the ship was on display behind glass.
In 2016, the museum was closed for 9 months whilst a £5.4 million development was undertaken that allows visitors to view the ship without being separated from it by a wall of glass.

References

External links

 
  Alt URL

1984 establishments in England
Museums established in 1984
Cultural infrastructure completed in 2013
Maritime museums in England
Museum ships in the United Kingdom
Museums in Portsmouth